Entwined is a 2011 novel written by Heather Dixon. It is based on the fairy tale "The Twelve Dancing Princesses".  Entwined tells the story of Princess Azalea and her eleven younger sisters, and the magic they discover while mourning the death of their mother.

Plot
Azalea, the Princess Royale, is tasked with hosting the annual Yuletide ball the royal family holds on Christmas Eve. The Queen, who is heavily pregnant and ill, summons Azalea to her room to give her a silver handkerchief and make her swear on it to take care of her sisters. At the ball, Azalea meets a young Lord Bradford and quickly warms up to him. Her ten sisters, who are all too young to attend, sneak in and watch the event, a sisterly tradition. The ball is abruptly ended by Prime Minister Fairweller, without explanation, and the girls are sent to their room.

The next morning Fairweller informs the princesses their mother died in the night, giving birth to their twelfth sister, Lily. As per tradition, the entire royal family are to go into mourning for a year. The princesses feel suffocated by all the restrictions, especially the one on dancing, which was their favorite pastime. The King goes off to war right after the funeral, leading the girls to wonder if he even loves them.

Months later, Azalea discovers a D'Eathe mark, a remnant of when the kingdom was ruled by the insane High King of D'Eathe, which can reveal secret rooms and passageways when rubbed with something silver, in the girls' bedroom. She rubs the handkerchief on it, revealing a passage with a staircase leading downwards. She wakes the other girls and they all descend. At the bottom they find a forest of silver trees and a pavilion full of enchanted dancers. They interrupt the party and the dancers disappear. The owner of the pavilion introduces himself as the Keeper, and explains he was part of the legendary High King's court, but rebelled and was trapped within the castle as punishment. He allows the princesses to dance to their hearts' content, and invites them to return every night until mourning is over.

Every night the girls dance so much that they wear through their slippers. They're often tired in the morning and late to lessons and breakfast, and constantly stitching up their tattered shoes. When the King returns from war he discovers the girls have been dancing at night, although he doesn't know where. Remembering the Queen's handkerchief and how magical it felt, Azalea makes her sisters all promise on it to never tell anyone about the pavilion. With no other choice, the King allows the girls to continue dancing, provided they don't speak about it in front of him.

One night, the Keeper tells the princesses a story about the High King drinking a goblet of blood and swearing an oath on it to not die until he's killed the Captain General. In the morning Azalea realizes that their watch is missing and goes back to retrieve it. Keeper reveals he's been stealing from them, and refuses to give their things back until they find the magic object that's keeping him confined within the walls of the castle. Azalea suspects the castle's magic sugar teeth, which have been around since The High King was alive.

The princesses start a castle-wide hunt for them, which proves fruitless. Meanwhile, the King puts an advertisement in the newspaper inviting gentlemen to stay at the castle for two days to try and solve the riddle of where the princesses dance at night. The girls are furious, but quickly realize it's only an attempt to skirt around mourning rules and get them meeting potential suitors. All of which prove to be stuck up, boring, or obnoxious.

Keeper once again steals from the girls, this time their mother's brooch. Azalea storms down to the pavilion upon discovering this, and tells him they're never going to come again, having realized Keeper is not as charming as he first appeared. The exit is magically blocked and the pavilion erupts into a wild and violent masquerade ball. As Azalea is being thrown about she sees the soul of her dead mother, leading her to realize Keeper is the High King. He tells her that he'll only release her mother if she finds the object trapping him, and then produces the sugar teeth. Azalea decides not to tell her sisters, suspecting Keeper can spy on them somehow.

Characters
 Azalea Kathryn Wentworth: Azalea is the main protagonist of the book and the eldest of the twelve sisters, at sixteen, and the Princess Royale. As eldest, she steps into the role as leader and surrogate-parent to the girls after their mother dies. She is fiercely protective of her family and naturally takes on responsibility. She's a talented dancer and loves dancing the most out of all of them, frequently using it as a way to make herself feel better. As Princess Royale, she's resigned to having an arranged marriage, since her choice is limited by the approval of both her father and parliament. Over the course of the book she falls in love with Lord Bradford, whom she meets at the royal Yuletide ball, and eventually proposes to. She has auburn hair and green eyes, looking quite like her mother.

 Bramble E. Wentworth: Bramble is sly, fiery, and the most rebellious of the group, as well as frequently being childish. Out of all the girls she reacts harshest to the King's actions, declaring that she hates him after he leaves for the war and taking the longest to forgive him. She falls in love with Lord Teddie, although it takes her a long time to admit this, as he's not the sort she would expect to fall for and she resents him for supposedly "stealing" her mother's portrait. She has dark red hair and yellow-green eyes, and is fifteen at the start of the book.  According to Azalea, Bramble is the best at doing curtsies out of all of the girls.

 Clover Wentworth: Clover is shyest of all the sisters, as well as the kindest and most thoughtful. She's frequently nervous and stutters a lot. She's considered the prettiest of all the princesses, and looks older than her age, meaning she receives a lot of attention from gentlemen wishing to court her. It's revealed she's harboured a secret crush on Fairweller for years, which is eventually reciprocated. As Fairweller secretly begins to court her, she grows stronger and more confident and begins to stutter less. Although initially the King doesn't approve (his first reaction is to punch Fairweller), he eventually agrees to the marriage and allows the Prime Minister to keep his place in parliament. Clover is described as being blonde with blue eyes. She's fourteen at the start of the book, though she turns fifteen later in the story.

 Delphinium Wentworth: At twelve, Delphinium thinks she's all-knowing, but her "wise" comments often make her look shallow and foolish. She has a tendency for drama and pretends to faint a lot, as well as being a hopeless romantic. Like Clover, she has blue eyes and blonde hair.

 Evening Primrose Wentworth: Eve is an eleven-year-old bookworm. She has dark hair, blue eyes, and wears spectacles.

 Flora Wentworth: The older and more outgoing of the twins. She's nine years old and looks identical to Goldenrod, having blue eyes and light brown hair that's usually worn in a braid.

 Goldenrod Wentworth: Flora's identical twin, nine years old. The twins are described as being like sparrows, timid and eager at the same time. Goldenrod is the shyer of the two.

 Hollyhock Wentworth: Holli is the clumsiest girl, easily losing things and having poor balance. At eight, she's described as having muddy green eyes, a freckly face, and bright red hair.

 Ivy Wentworth: Ivy is famous for having an extremely large appetite. She is rarely ever not eating if she can help it, and it's considered a great compliment if she offers someone her food. She is five, with light hair and blue eyes.

 Jessamine Wentworth: Jess is tiny and has a "crystalline voice", which is probably owed to her being four. She has dark black hair like Eve, and crystal blue eyes.

 Kale Wentworth Kale, affectionately nicknamed "Kabbage" by Bramble, is two years old and known for her bites. She's a good dancer for her age and can keep in time with the beats. Being so young, she quickly forgets who her mother is after she passes away. She has light brown hair and soft blue eyes.

 Lily Wentworth: is the last and youngest of the princesses. The Queen died while giving birth to her, living just long enough to name her. She gnaws on things frequently.

  King Harold Wentworth, the Eleventh of Eathesbury: The King is the strict father of the princesses, who likes order, structure, and rules, and tends to be rather stiff and formal. He's distraught over the death of his wife, and shuts his daughters out when they need him most, causing them to believe he doesn't love them or want them. When he returns from the war he tries to undo the damage he's caused to his relationship with his daughters, eventually mending the rift between them. Although the girls have been raised to call him "The King" or "Sir", he remembers a time when his eldest daughters called him "Papa", and wishes they'd do it again.

 Lord Bradford: Lord Bradford first meets the princesses at the Yuletide ball, where he and Azalea meet and fall in love.  When mourning commands for all the clocks to be stopped, he lends the princesses his pocket watch so they may keep time.  Though Azalea loves Lord Bradford, she knows that she will have no say in who she marries, as parliament will choose the future king.  Later on when Azalea is trying to defeat the keeper, Lord Bradford stands by her side and help her devise a plan.

 Prime Minister Fairweller:  Fairweller is the strange and serious prime minister of Eathsbury.  The princesses dislike him and enjoy causing trouble for him.  Fairweller ends up secretly falling in love with Clover, which everyone, especially the king, doesn't like.

 Lord Teddie:  Lord Teddie is one of the gentlemen who come to the castle to solve the riddle.  Because of his goofy personality, he quickly becomes a favorite among the girls except Bramble, whom he falls in love with.  In time, Bramble admits she loves him back.

 The Keeper: The Keeper is the creature who owns the magical palace that girls dance in at night.

 The Queen: The unnamed mother of the twelve princesses, and the beloved wife of King Harold. She dies in childbirth, and the King is heartbroken over her death, causing him to unintentionally push his daughters away. Azalea most resembles the queen. As Azalea's middle name is Kathryn, and the queen possesses a handkerchief with the monogram, 'K.E.W', it is likely the queen's name is also Kathryn.

Reception

References 

2011 American novels
American fantasy novels
2011 fantasy novels
Novels based on fairy tales
Greenwillow Books books